The Palace on the River (Italian: La Reggia sul fiume) is a 1940 Italian comedy film directed by Alberto Salvi and starring Ferdinand Guillaume, Leda Gloria and Gildo Bocci. Three penniless friends live in a slum by a river which they nickname "the palace". Taking pity on a struggling orphaned young woman, they take her in and look after her. In order to raise money so she can marry her sweetheart, they decide to try and collect a reward for capturing a notorious thief.

The film's sets were designed by the art director Ivo Battelli. It was shot at Cinecittà Studios in Rome.

Cast
 Ferdinand Guillaume as Un barbone 
 Gino Bianchi as L'altro barbone 
 Gildo Bocci as Un terzo barbone 
 Liana Persi as L'orfana 
 Renzo Merusi as Il disoccupato 
 Renato Chiantoni as Le scrittore illuso 
 Giulio Alfieri
 Iginia Armilli
 Giulio Battiferri
 Oreste Bilancia
 Carlo De Cristofaro
 Leda Gloria
 Dante Maggio
 Guglielmina Marchi
 Carlo Seralessandri
 Giuseppe Zago

References

Bibliography 
 Francesco Savio. Ma l'amore no: realismo, formalismo, propaganda e telefoni bianchi nel cinema italiano di regime (1930-1943). Sonzogno, 1975.

External links 
 

1940 comedy films
Italian comedy films
1940 films
1940s Italian-language films
Italian black-and-white films
Films shot at Cinecittà Studios
1940s Italian films